Herschel Ray Jacobs (born November 21, 1938) is a former professional American football defensive tackle in the American Football League for the Denver Broncos, Miami Dolphins and Boston Patriots. He played college football at Howard Payne University.

Early years
Jacobs attended Corsicana High School, before moving on to Navarro Junior College. After his freshman season he transferred to Howard Payne University, where he played offensive tackle and defensive tackle. He was a two-time NAIA All-American and a three-time Lone Star Conference selection.

In 2005, Jacobs was inducted into the Howard Payne University Sports Hall of Fame. He was inducted to the Navarro College athletic hall of fame in 2021.

Professional career

Houston Oilers
Jacobs was selected by the Houston Oilers in the first round (7th overall) of the 1962 AFL Draft and was also selected by the Dallas Cowboys in the seventeenth round (228th overall) of the 1962 NFL Draft. Although he signed contracts with both teams, he chose to report to the Oilers training camp.

Besides playing defensive end, he also was tried as a placekicker. He was waived on August 19, 1963.

Denver Broncos
On October 29, 1963, he was claimed off waivers by the Denver Broncos. He was used as a defensive end before switching to defensive tackle and was a two-time second-team All-AFL. On May 4, 1967, he was traded to the Miami Dolphins in exchange for tight end Bill Cronin.

Miami Dolphins
In 1968, although he was limited during the season with multiple injuries, he led the Miami Dolphins with 107 tackles. On March 4, 1969, he was traded to the Oakland Raiders in exchange for an undisclosed draft choice (not exercised).

Oakland Raiders
Jacobs was released before the start of the season on September 9, 1969.

Buffalo Bills
In September 1969, he was signed by the Buffalo Bills to their development squad. On October 21, he was traded to the Boston Patriots in exchange for an eighth round draft choice (#183-Louis Ross).

Boston Patriots
In 1969, he played in 8 contests. He recovered two fumbles in the seventh game against the New York Jets. He was injured in the last game of the season against the Houston Oilers, suffering disc damage on his back and could not report to training camp the next year, forcing the team to cut ties with him.

Personal life
Jacobs later became a football coach at Mabank High School. He had 8 knee operations during his professional career.

References

External links
 HPU Sports Hall of Fame bio
 Old Man Jacobs Needs No Help

1939 births
Living people
American football defensive tackles
American Football League players
Boston Patriots players
Denver Broncos (AFL) players
Houston Oilers players
Howard Payne Yellow Jackets football players
Miami Dolphins players
Navarro Bulldogs football players
High school football coaches in Texas
People from Corsicana, Texas
Players of American football from Texas